Stoss Pass (el. 942 m.) is a mountain pass between the cantons of Appenzell Innerrhoden and Appenzell Ausserrhoden in Switzerland.

History
On June 17, 1405, during the Appenzell Wars, there was a battle on the pass between 400 soldiers from Appenzell and 1200 Habsburg and abbatial soldiers. The Appenzellers were victorious and thereby won their independence from the Abbey of Saint Gall. There is a monument on the site.

See also
 List of highest paved roads in Europe
 List of mountain passes

References

Mountain passes of Switzerland
Mountain passes of the Alps
Mountain passes of Appenzell Innerrhoden
Mountain passes of Appenzell Ausserrhoden
Appenzell Ausserrhoden–Appenzell Innerrhoden border